Silver Creek is an unincorporated community in Hardin County, in the U.S. state of Ohio.

History
Silver Creek was originally called Hudsonville, and under the latter name had its start in 1846 when the railroad was extended to that point. A post office called Silver Creek was established in 1864, and remained in operation until 1995.

References

Unincorporated communities in Hardin County, Ohio
1846 establishments in Ohio
Populated places established in 1846
Unincorporated communities in Ohio